Soren Monkongtong (born 31 May 1980) is an Australian middleweight kickboxer.  In 2007 he took part of the reality based television series The Contender Asia.

Biography and career 
Soren Monkongtong started training in muay thai at the age of 13 and had his first fight at 15.  He is now one of the most active professional Muay Thai fighters in the world. At the moment Soren is training at Eminent Air Gym in Bangkok. Some of the fighters he has fought are John Wayne Parr, Jomhod, Bruce Macfie, Naruepol Fairtex and Warren Elson. Soren has fought for the WMPF super-welterweight world title, however lost to the Thai fighter on the judges' scorecard. he is now retired and trains people at nuggets gym in Australia Brisbane.

The Contender Asia 
In 2007 Soren Monkongtong was featured in The Contender Asia reality show. Soren was on the Tiger Kings. He fought Alain Sylvestre whom he beat and lost to Dzhabar Askerov after being knocked out by a vicious overhand right. In the Contender Finale, Soren fought Sean Wright and won on points.

Titles 
 2007 WMC Intercontinental champion middleweight
 2005 WMC Evolution champion
 2004 WMC Evolution champion
 2004 Chewang Stadium champion
 2002 WMC SUPA8 champion
 2002 WMC Intercontinental Welter weight champion
 2001 Oceanic Champion
 2001 Australia Champion

Kickboxing record

See also 
 List of male kickboxers

References

External links

1980 births
Living people
Australian male kickboxers
Middleweight kickboxers
Australian Muay Thai practitioners
Kickboxers from Brisbane
The Contender (TV series) participants